Lamari is a surname. Notable people with the surname include: 

Mohamed Lamari (1939–2012), Chief of Staff of the Algerian army during most of the Algerian Civil War
Mohamed Lamari (footballer) (born 1937), Moroccan footballer
Smain Lamari (1941–2007), head of the Algerian Department of Counter-Espionage and Internal Security

Places
Lamari can also refer to some places in Papua New Guinea.

Lamari River, a river in Papua New Guinea
Lamari Rural LLG, Papua New Guinea